Eulima major is a species of sea snail, a marine gastropod mollusk in the family Eulimidae. The species is one of a number within the genus Eulima.

Description

The shell measures approximately 38 mm in length.

Distribution

This species occurs in the following locations:

 Mauritius

References

External links
 To World Register of Marine Species

major
Gastropods described in 1834